The Gamilaraay or Kamilaroi language is a Pama–Nyungan language of the Wiradhuric subgroup found mostly in south-eastern Australia. It is the traditional language of the Gamilaraay (Kamilaroi), an Aboriginal Australian people. It has been noted as endangered, but the number of speakers grew from 87 in the 2011 Australian Census to 105 in the 2016 Australian Census. Thousands of Australians identify as Gamilaraay, and the language is taught in some schools.

Wirray Wirray, Guyinbaraay, Yuwaalayaay, Waalaraay and Gawambaraay are dialects; Yuwaalaraay/Euahlayi is a closely related language.

Name
The name Gamilaraay means '-having', with  being the word for 'no'. Other dialects and languages are similarly named after their respective words for 'no'. (Compare the division between langues d'oïl and langues d'oc in France, distinguished by their respective words for 'yes'.)

Spellings of the name, pronounced  in the language itself, include Goomeroi; Kamilaroi; Gamilaraay and Gamilaroi.

Dialects

While AUSTLANG cites Euahlayi, Ualarai, Euhahlayi, and Juwalarai as synonyms for Gamilaraay in earlier sources, it has updated its codes to reflect more recent sources suggest different distinctions.  AIATSIS groups the Yuwaalaraay/Euahlayi/Yuwaaliyaay language and people in its resource collection, and gives it a separate code (D23). AUSTLANG assigns separate codes to the following dialects, all related and part of the Gamilaraay  group: 
Yuwaalaraay (Yuwaaliyaay, Euahlayi) (D27), spoken by the Yuwaalaraay people;
Wirray Wirray (Wiriwiri) (D28);
Guyinbaraay (Gunjbaraay) (D15);
Yuwaalayaay (D54);
Waalaraay (Walaraay) (D55);
Gawambaraay (Kawambarai) (D39), spoken by the Gawambaraay people.

According to Robert Fuller of the Department of Indigenous Studies at Macquarie University and his colleagues, the Gamilaraay and Euahlayi peoples are a cultural grouping of north and northwest New South Wales (NSW), and the Gamilaraay dialect groups are known as Gamilaraay and Yuwaalaraay, while the Euahlayi (Euayelai) have a similar but distinct language.

History
Southern Aboriginal guides led the surveyor John Howe to the upper Hunter River above present-day Singleton in 1819. They told him that the country there was "Coomery Roy [=Gamilaraay] and more further a great way", meaning to the north-west, over the Liverpool Ranges. This is probably the first record of the name.

A basic wordlist collected by Thomas Mitchell in February, 1832, is the earliest written record of Gamilaraay.

Presbyterian missionary William Ridley studied the language from 1852 to 1856.

Status
In 2013 Gamilaraay was noted as endangered by Ethnologue, with only 35 speakers left in 2006 (AUSTLANG says 37 at that date), all mixing Gamilaraay and English. At the 2011 Census there were 87 speakers recorded and in 2016, 105.

Phonology

Vowels

Consonants

Stress
All long vowels in a word get equal stress. If  no long vowels are present, stress falls on the first syllable. Secondary stress falls on short vowels, which are two syllables to the right or to the left of a stressed syllable.

Grammar

Pronouns
Gawambaraay Dialect

Subject pronouns:

Gamilaraay words in English
Several loanwords have entered Australian English from Gamilaraay, including:

Footnotes

References

Bibliography 

 (On Google Books)

Further reading
Ash, Anna et al. Gamilaraay, Yuwaaaraay and Yuwaalayaay Dictionary. Alice Springs: IAD Press 2003.
 Contains a glossary

External links

http://yuwaalaraay.org/ has information about recent Gamilaraay and Yuwaalaraay language development and links to numerous language resources. 
The Gamilaraay (Kamilaroi) Language, northern New South Wales — A Brief History of Research (PDF)
Gutenberg Project Browse By Language: Gamilaraay
Online dictionary
Gamilaraay Online dictionary by Peter Austin and David Nathan
A Reference Grammar of Gamilaraay
Bibliographies of published, rare or special materials on Gamilaraay language and people, at the Australian Institute of Aboriginal and Torres Strait Islander Studies
Bibliographies of published, rare or special materials on Yuwaalaraay language and people, at the Australian Institute of Aboriginal and Torres Strait Islander Studies
Des Crump digital story, State Library of Queensland. Digital story discussing Gamilaraay language.

Gamilaraay
Wiradhuric languages
Critically endangered languages